Al-Bayyadiyah (also spelled Beyadiyeh) is a village in northern Syria, administratively part of the Hama Governorate, located southwest of Hama. Nearby localities include al-Bayda and district center Masyaf to the northwest, Ayn Halaqim to the southwest, Baarin and Nisaf to the south, Aqrab to the southeast and al-Muah to the east. According to the Syria Central Bureau of Statistics (CBS), al-Bayyadiyah had a population of 2,701 in the 2004 census. Its inhabitants are predominantly Alawites and Christians.

References

Bibliography

Populated places in Masyaf District
Alawite communities in Syria
Christian communities in Syria